Reiher is a surname. Notable people with the surname include:

Alan Reiher (1927–2003), Australian public servant
Christian Reiher (born 1984), German mathematician
Darren Reiher (born 1978), American actor
Hendrik Reiher (born 1962), German rowing cox

Aircraft
DFS Reiher, a 1937 German glider

Ships
, at least three ships of this name

See also
Reimer